Accra Milo Marathon is an annual event held in Accra, the capital city of Ghana. It has been held since 1987 and is still moving ahead. Winners of this event are usually sent to compete in the Amsterdam Marathon. It starts at the Point in Nungua and the finish line is at the Dansoman Keep Fit Club. It is normally run in September but sometimes October when the need arises.

References

Marathons in Ghana
Sport in Accra
Recurring sporting events established in 1987